San Columbano is the Italian form of Saint Columbanus.

It is also the name of:
the Italian town formerly called Mombrione
San Columbano Abbey, a territorial abbey in Italy